is a type of traditional Japanese embroidery or stitching used for the decorative and/or functional reinforcement of cloth and clothing. Owing to the relatively cheap nature of white cotton thread and the abundant nature of cheap, indigo-dyed blue cloth in historical Japan,  has a distinctive appearance of white-on-blue embroidery, though some decorative pieces may also use red thread.

First coming into existence in the Edo period (1603–1867),  embroidery was first applied to clothing out of a practical need, and would have been used to strengthen the homespun clothes of olden times. Worn out clothes were pieced together to make new garments by using simple running stitches. These clothes increased their strength with this durable embroidery. By the Meiji period (1868–1912),  had been established enough that it had evolved into winter work in northern farming communities, when it was too cold to work outside.

 was commonly used to reinforce already-patched clothing around points of wear, but would also be used to attach patches to clothing, making the fabric ultimately stronger. It would also be used to layer thin fabrics to create warmth, and, in the case of some garments such as the coats of firemen , to create a thick and absorbent material that would be soaked in water before carrying out duties as a fireman. Though most  utilises only a plain running stitch technique,  is commonly used to create decorative and repeated embroidered patterns, and may be used for purely decorative purposes, such as in the creation of quilts and embroidery samplers.

Common  motifs are waves, mountains, bamboo, arrow feathers, pampas grass and interlocking geometric shapes, amongst others;  embroidery is traditionally applied with the use of specialist needles and thread, though modern day  may use modern embroidery threads and embroidery needles.

Designs and patterns
Other developments in  have come from the work of Japanese artists, such as Katsushika Hokusai (1760–1849), whose 1824 New Forms for Design inspired many  patterns.

 designs typically derive from nature, with some, considered to hold symbolism, seen particularly on garments such as the coats of fishermen.

Common  patterns

 
 
 
 
 
 
  — also known as

References

External links 

  (on origins of )
 Archived iInformation with designs at quilt.com
 Introduction to Sashiko at designbyaika.com
 Sashiko Embroidery designs and tutorial

Japanese folk art
Embroidery stitches
Embroidery
Quilting
Japanese stitching techniques
Japanese words and phrases